Sarah Isabella Leberman  is a New Zealand sport management academic, as of 2012 is a full professor at the Massey University.

Academic career
After a 1999 PhD titled  'The transfer of learning from the classroom to the workplace: a New Zealand case study '  at the Victoria University of Wellington, Leberman moved to the Massey University, rising to full professor.

Awards and honours 
In 2019, Leberman won the NEXT Woman of the Year in the Sport category.

In the 2020 Queen's Birthday Honours, Leberman was appointed a Member of the New Zealand Order of Merit, for services to women, sport and tertiary education.

In 2020 Leberman received the Zonta New Zealand Woman of the Biennium Award.

Selected works

Books 

 Leberman, Sarah, and Lex McDonald. The transfer of learning: Participants' perspectives of adult education and training. Routledge, 2016.;-

Peer reviewed journal articles 
For up to date publication list refer to https://www.researchgate.net/profile/Sarah_Leberman

References

External links
 
  
 

Living people
New Zealand women academics
Year of birth missing (living people)
Victoria University of Wellington alumni
Academic staff of the Massey University
Members of the New Zealand Order of Merit
New Zealand women writers